Mount Vernon College could refer to:

 Mount Vernon Seminary, a former name for Peru State College in Peru, Nebraska
 Mount Vernon College for Women, now a part of George Washington University